Abu al-Saqr Abd al-Aziz ibn Uthman ibn Ali al-Qabisi, generally known as Al-Qabisi, (Latinised as Alchabitius or Alcabitius), and sometimes known as Alchabiz, Abdelazys, Abdilaziz (Arabic: 'Abd al-Azîz,  عبدالعزيز القبيصي), (died 967) was a Muslim astrologer, astronomer, and mathematician.

Life
Originally from Qabisa in Iraq, Alchabitius later went to Aleppo where he worked for and lived in the palace of Sayf al-Dawla. He died in 967.

Work
Al-Qabisi is best known for his treatise on judicial astrology, Introduction to the Art of Judgments of the Stars. This was dedicated to the Emir of Aleppo, Prince Sayf al-Dawla, and survives in at least twenty-five Arabic manuscripts, and over two hundred manuscripts of its Latin translation, with twelve printed editions of the Latin work between 1473 and 1521. The Arabic text has received at least three Latin translations, which attracted several commentaries and were, in turn, translated into other European languages. In the 12th century it was translated by Johannes Hispalensis. In 1512 it was published by Melchiorre Sessa in Venice. The 1473 copy, and others up until 1521, features writing about Al-Qabisi by John of Saxony, who commented his astrological works.

Al-Qabisi wrote a modest book on arithmetic, "Risala fi anwâ' al-‘adad" (Treatise on the kinds of numbers), in which he discusses Euclid's perfect numbers and how to form them, and Thābit ibn Qurra's theorem on amicable numbers.

Other works include:
 Risala fi al-ab'âd wa-'l-ajrâm (treatise on distances and bodies);
 Kitāb fi ithbāt ṣinā’at Aḥkām al-nujūm (On Confirming the Art of Astrology);
 Hal al-Zîjat (Solving astronomical tables);
 Risāla fī imtiḥān al‐munajjimīn (A treatise for the examination of astrologers)
 Shukūk al‐Majisṭī (Doubts on the Almagest);
The belief in the power of stars dated back to Alexandrinian sect of iatromathematicians and the more ancient cult of Hermes Trismegistos.

See also
Al-Biruni
Haly Abenragel

References

External links
 
  (PDF version)

Year of birth missing
967 deaths
10th-century astronomers
Medieval Syrian astronomers
Astronomers of the medieval Islamic world
Medieval Syrian mathematicians